2012 Regional League Division 2 North-East Region is the 4th season of the League competition since its establishment in 2009. It is in the third tier of the Thai football league system. The league winners and runners up will qualify for the 2012 Regional League Division 2 championship stage.

Changes from Last Season

Team Changes

Promoted Clubs

Nakhon Ratchasima were promoted to the 2012 Thai Division 1 League.

Expansion Clubs

Sisaket United joined the newly expanded league setup.

Returning Clubs

Ubon United is returning to the league after a 2-year break.

Withdrawn Clubs

Ubon United have withdrawn from the 2012 campaign.

Renamed Clubs

 Ubon Tiger renamed Ubon Rachathani

Stadium and locations

League table

References

External links
 Football Association of Thailand

Regional League North-East Division seasons
North

th:ลีกภูมิภาค ภาคตะวันออกเฉียงเหนือ ฤดูกาล 2554